Clara Solovera (May 15, 1909 - January 27, 1992) was a famous Chilean folk musician and composer. She was Chile's most popular folk music composer in the early 1960s.

References

External links
Clara Solovera at MusicaPopular.cl 

1909 births
1992 deaths
20th-century Chilean women singers
Chilean folk singers
People from Santiago